The Cecil Hemley Memorial Award is given once a year to a member of the Poetry Society of America "for a lyric poem that addresses a philosophical or epistemological concern."

The award was established by Jack Stadler, the former Treasurer of the PSA, and his late wife, Ralynne Stadler. Cecil Hemley was a poet and a translator from the Yiddish.

Each winner receives a $500 prize.

Winners
2001: Angie Estes, Judge: Lynn Emanuel
2002: Andrew Zawacki, Judge: Wayne Koestenbaum
2003: Lynn Veach Sadler, Judge: 
2004: Fritz Ward, Judge: Susan Stewart
2005: G. C. Waldrep, Judge: Alice Notley
2006: Rusty Morrison, Judge: Cal Bedient 
2007: Yerra Sugarman, Judge: Michael Palmer
2008: Brian Henry, Judge: Norma Cole
2009: Melissa Kwasny, Judge: Mei-mei Berssenbrugge
2010: Karla Kelsey, Judge: Forrest Gander

See also
 Poetry Society of America
 List of American literary awards
 List of poetry awards
 List of years in poetry

Notes

External links
Poetry Society of America main awards Web page

American poetry awards
Awards established in 2001
Philosophy awards